Forest High School is a coeducational secondary school with academy status, located in Cinderford in the English county of Gloucestershire.

The school was established as Double View Secondary Modern School on Woodville Road in Cinderford,  but expanded to the current site on Causeway Road in the early-mid-1970s. The school continued to operate over both sites until 1979 when the Woodville Road site closed. Double View was renamed Heywood School in the mid-1980s, and later Heywood Community School in the early 1990s.

Heywood Community School became a foundation school in the 2000s, and was administered by Gloucestershire County Council until September 2012 when the school converted to academy status. The school was renamed Forest E-ACT Academy, and was sponsored by E-ACT. However in 2014 the E-Act announced that they would be withdrawing as sponsor, and that the school would join the Redhill Academy Trust and was then renamed Forest Academy. However in 2015 the new academy sponsor was named as the SGS Schools Trust, and the school was renamed The Forest High School.

References

External links
School official website

Secondary schools in Gloucestershire
Academies in Gloucestershire